Lori Klein may refer to:

Lori Klein (politician), American politician
Lori Klein (rabbi), American rabbi and former attorney